Narcosis while diving (also known as nitrogen narcosis, inert gas narcosis, raptures of the deep, Martini effect) is a reversible alteration in consciousness that occurs while diving at depth. It is caused by the anesthetic effect of certain gases at high pressure. Narcosis produces a state similar to drunkenness (alcohol intoxication), or nitrous oxide inhalation.

Except for helium and probably neon, all gases that can be breathed have a narcotic effect, although widely varying in degree.  The effect is consistently greater for gases with a higher lipid solubility, and although the mechanism of this phenomenon is still not fully clear, there is good evidence that the two properties are mechanistically related. As depth increases, the mental impairment may become hazardous. Divers can learn to cope with some of the effects of narcosis, but it is impossible to develop a tolerance. Narcosis can affect all divers, although susceptibility varies widely among individuals and from dive to dive. The main class of diving that deals with its prevention and treatment is scuba diving at substantial depth.

Narcosis may be completely reversed in a few minutes by ascending to a shallower depth, with no long-term effects. Thus narcosis while diving in open water rarely develops into a serious problem as long as the divers are aware of its symptoms, and are able to ascend to manage it. Diving much beyond  is generally considered outside the scope of recreational diving. In order to dive at greater depths, as narcosis and oxygen toxicity become critical risk factors, specialist training is required in the use of various helium-containing gas mixtures such as trimix or heliox. These mixtures prevent narcosis by replacing some or all of the inert fraction of the breathing gas with non-narcotic helium.

Classification 
Narcosis results from breathing gases under elevated pressure, and may be classified by the principal gas involved. The noble gases, except helium and probably neon, as well as nitrogen, oxygen and hydrogen cause a decrement in mental function, but their effect on psychomotor function (processes affecting the coordination of sensory or cognitive processes and motor activity) varies widely. The effect of carbon dioxide is a consistent diminution of mental and psychomotor function. The noble gases argon, krypton, and xenon are more narcotic than nitrogen at a given pressure, and xenon has so much anesthetic activity that it is a usable anesthetic at 80% concentration and normal atmospheric pressure. Xenon has historically been too expensive to be used very much in practice, but it has been successfully used for surgical operations, and xenon anesthesia systems are still being proposed and designed.

Signs and symptoms 

Due to its perception-altering effects, the onset of narcosis may be hard to recognize. At its most benign, narcosis results in relief of anxiety – a feeling of tranquillity and mastery of the environment. These effects are essentially identical to various concentrations of nitrous oxide. They also resemble (though not as closely) the effects of alcohol and the familiar benzodiazepine drugs such as diazepam and alprazolam. Such effects are not harmful unless they cause some immediate danger to go unrecognized and unaddressed. Once stabilized, the effects generally remain the same at a given depth, only worsening if the diver ventures deeper.

The most dangerous aspects of narcosis are the impairment of judgement, multi-tasking and coordination, and the loss of decision-making ability and focus. Other effects include vertigo and visual or auditory disturbances. The syndrome may cause exhilaration, giddiness, extreme anxiety, depression, or paranoia, depending on the individual diver and the diver's medical or personal history. When more serious, the diver may feel overconfident, disregarding normal safe diving practices. Slowed mental activity, as indicated by increased reaction time and increased errors in cognitive function, are effects which increase the risk of a diver mismanaging an incident. Narcosis reduces both the perception of cold discomfort and shivering and thereby affects the production of body heat and consequently allows a faster drop in the core temperature in cold water, with reduced awareness of the developing problem.

Professional divers use such a calculation only as a rough guide to give new divers a metaphor, comparing a situation they may be more familiar with.

Reported signs and symptoms are summarized against typical depths in meters and feet of sea water in the following table, closely adapted from Deeper into Diving by Lippman and Mitchell:

Causes 

The cause of narcosis is related to the increased solubility of gases in body tissues, as a result of the elevated pressures at depth (Henry's law). Modern theories have suggested that inert gases dissolving in the lipid bilayer of cell membranes cause narcosis. More recently, researchers have been looking at neurotransmitter receptor protein mechanisms as a possible cause of narcosis. The breathing gas mix entering the diver's lungs will have the same pressure as the surrounding water, known as the ambient pressure. After any change of depth, the pressure of gases in the blood passing through the brain catches up with ambient pressure within a minute or two, which results in a delayed narcotic effect after descending to a new depth. Rapid compression potentiates narcosis owing to carbon dioxide retention.

There is no reliable method to predict the depth at which narcosis becomes noticeable, or the severity of the effect on an individual diver, as it may vary from dive to dive even on the same day.

Most sport scuba training organizations recommend depths of no more than  because of the risk of narcosis. When breathing air at depths of  – an ambient pressure of about  – narcosis in most divers leads to hallucinations, loss of memory, and unconsciousness. A number of divers have died in attempts to set air depth records below . Because of these incidents, Guinness World Records no longer reports on this figure.

Narcosis has been compared with altitude sickness regarding its variability of onset (though not its symptoms); its effects depend on many factors, with variations between individuals. Thermal cold, stress, heavy work, fatigue, and carbon dioxide retention all increase the risk and severity of narcosis. Carbon dioxide has a high narcotic potential and also causes increased blood flow to the brain, increasing the effects of other gases. Increased risk of narcosis results from increasing the amount of carbon dioxide retained through heavy exercise, shallow or skip breathing, or because of poor gas exchange in the lungs.

Narcosis is known to be additive to even minimal alcohol intoxication. Other sedative and analgesic drugs, such as opiate narcotics and benzodiazepines, add to narcosis.

Mechanism 

The precise mechanism is not well understood, but it appears to be the direct effect of gas dissolving into nerve membranes and causing temporary disruption in nerve transmissions. While the effect was first observed with air, other gases including argon, krypton and hydrogen cause very similar effects at higher than atmospheric pressure. Some of these effects may be due to antagonism at NMDA receptors and potentiation of GABAA receptors, similar to the mechanism of nonpolar anesthetics such diethyl ether or ethylene. However, their reproduction by the very chemically inactive gas argon makes them unlikely to be a strictly chemical bonding to receptors in the usual sense of a chemical bond. An indirect physical effect – such as a change in membrane volume – would therefore be needed to affect the ligand-gated ion channels of nerve cells. Trudell et al. have suggested non-chemical binding due to the attractive van der Waals force between proteins and inert gases.

Similar to the mechanism of ethanol's effect, the increase of gas dissolved in nerve cell membranes may cause altered ion permeability properties of the neural cells' lipid bilayers. The partial pressure of a gas required to cause a measured degree of impairment correlates well with the lipid solubility of the gas: the greater the solubility, the less partial pressure is needed.

An early theory, the Meyer-Overton hypothesis, suggested that narcosis happens when the gas penetrates the lipids of the brain's nerve cells, causing direct mechanical interference with the transmission of signals from one nerve cell to another. More recently, specific types of chemically gated receptors in nerve cells have been identified as being involved with anesthesia and narcosis. However, the basic and most general underlying idea, that nerve transmission is altered in many diffuse areas of the brain as a result of gas molecules dissolved in the nerve cells' fatty membranes, remains largely unchallenged.

Management and diagnosis 
The management of narcosis is simply to ascend to shallower depths; the effects then disappear within minutes. In the event of complications or other conditions being present, ascending is always the correct initial response. Should problems remain, then it is necessary to abort the dive. The decompression schedule can still be followed unless other conditions require emergency assistance.

The symptoms of narcosis may be caused by other factors during a dive: ear problems causing disorientation or nausea; early signs of oxygen toxicity causing visual disturbances; or hypothermia causing rapid breathing and shivering. Nevertheless, the presence of any of these symptoms should imply narcosis. Alleviation of the effects upon ascending to a shallower depth will confirm the diagnosis. Given the setting, other likely conditions do not produce reversible effects. In the rare event of misdiagnosis when another condition is causing the symptoms, the initial management – ascending closer to the surface – is still essential.

Prevention 

The most straightforward way to avoid nitrogen narcosis is for a diver to limit the depth of dives. The other main preventive measure is properly informed selection/choice of which gas to use for the particular dive under consideration.

Since narcosis becomes more severe as depth increases, a diver keeping to shallower depths can avoid serious narcosis. Scuba organizations that train for diving beyond recreational depths, may forbid diving with gases that cause too much narcosis at depth in the average diver (such as the typical widely used nitrox mixtures suitable for most recreational diving), and strongly encourage the use of other breathing gas mixes containing helium in place of some or all of the nitrogen in air – such as trimix and heliox – because helium has no narcotic effect. The use of these gases forms part of technical diving and requires further training and certification.

While the individual diver cannot predict exactly at what depth the onset of narcosis will occur on a given day, the first symptoms of narcosis for any given diver are often more predictable and personal. For example, one diver may have trouble with eye focus (close accommodation for middle-aged divers), another may experience feelings of euphoria, and another feelings of claustrophobia. Some divers report that they have hearing changes, and that the sound their exhaled bubbles make becomes different. Specialist training may help divers to identify these personal onset signs, which may then be used as a signal to ascend to avoid the narcosis, although severe narcosis may interfere with the judgement necessary to take preventive action.

Deep dives should be made only after a gradual training to test the individual diver's sensitivity to increasing depths, with careful supervision and logging of reactions. Scientific evidence does not show that a diver can train to overcome any measure of narcosis at a given depth or become tolerant of it.

Equivalent narcotic depth (END) is a commonly used way of expressing the narcotic effect of different breathing gases. The National Oceanic and Atmospheric Administration (NOAA) Diving Manual now states that oxygen and nitrogen should be considered equally narcotic. Standard tables, based on relative lipid solubilities, list conversion factors for narcotic effect of other gases. For example, hydrogen at a given pressure has a narcotic effect equivalent to nitrogen at 0.55 times that pressure, so in principle it should be usable at more than twice the depth. Argon, however, has 2.33 times the narcotic effect of nitrogen, and is a poor choice as a breathing gas for diving (it is used as a drysuit inflation gas, owing to its low thermal conductivity). Some gases have other dangerous effects when breathed at pressure; for example, high-pressure oxygen can lead to oxygen toxicity. Although helium is the least intoxicating of the breathing gases, at greater depths it can cause high pressure nervous syndrome, a still mysterious but apparently unrelated phenomenon. Inert gas narcosis is only one factor influencing the choice of gas mixture; the risks of decompression sickness and oxygen toxicity, cost, and other factors are also important.

Because of similar and additive effects, divers should avoid sedating medications and drugs, such as cannabis and alcohol before any dive. A hangover, combined with the reduced physical capacity that goes with it, makes nitrogen narcosis more likely. Experts recommend total abstinence from alcohol for at least 12 hours before diving, and longer for other drugs.

Prognosis and epidemiology 
Except for occasional amnesia of events at depth, the effects of narcosis are entirely removed on ascent and therefore pose no problem in themselves, even for repeated, chronic or acute exposure. Nevertheless, the severity of narcosis is unpredictable and it can be fatal while diving, as the result of illogical behavior in a dangerous environment.

Tests have shown that all divers are affected by nitrogen narcosis, though some experience lesser effects than others. Even though it is possible that some divers can manage better than others because of learning to cope with the subjective impairment, the underlying behavioral effects remain. These effects are particularly dangerous because a diver may feel they are not experiencing narcosis, yet still be affected by it.

History 

French researcher Victor T. Junod was the first to describe symptoms of narcosis in 1834, noting "the functions of the brain are activated, imagination is lively, thoughts have a peculiar charm and, in some persons, symptoms of intoxication are present." Junod suggested that narcosis resulted from pressure causing increased blood flow and hence stimulating nerve centers. Walter Moxon (1836–1886), a prominent Victorian physician, hypothesized in 1881 that pressure forced blood to inaccessible parts of the body and the stagnant blood then resulted in emotional changes. The first report of anesthetic potency being related to lipid solubility was published by Hans H. Meyer in 1899, entitled Zur Theorie der Alkoholnarkose. Two years later a similar theory was published independently by Charles Ernest Overton. What became known as the Meyer-Overton hypothesis may be illustrated by a graph comparing narcotic potency with solubility in oil.

In 1939, Albert R. Behnke and O. D. Yarborough demonstrated that gases other than nitrogen also could cause narcosis. For an inert gas the narcotic potency was found to be proportional to its lipid solubility. As hydrogen has only 0.55 the solubility of nitrogen, deep diving experiments using hydrox were conducted by Arne Zetterström between 1943 and 1945. Jacques-Yves Cousteau in 1953 famously described it as "l'ivresse des grandes profondeurs" or the "rapture of the deep".

Further research into the possible mechanisms of narcosis by anesthetic action led to the "minimum alveolar concentration" concept in 1965. This measures the relative concentration of different gases required to prevent motor response in 50% of subjects in response to stimulus, and shows similar results for anesthetic potency as the measurements of lipid solubility. The (NOAA) Diving Manual was revised to recommend treating oxygen as if it were as narcotic as nitrogen, following research by Christian J. Lambertsen et al. in 1977 and 1978.

See also

Footnotes

References

Notes

Sources

External links 
 Undersea and Hyperbaric Medical Society Scientific body, publications about nitrogen narcosis.
 Diving Diseases Research Centre (DDRC) UK charity dedicated to treatment of diving diseases.
  ScubaDoc's overview of marijuana and diving.
  ScubaDoc's overview of alcohol and diving.
 

Diving medicine
Underwater diving safety